In mathematics, a paramodular group is a special sort of arithmetic subgroup of the symplectic group. It is a generalization of the Siegel modular group, and has the same relation to polarized abelian varieties that the Siegel modular group has to principally polarized abelian varieties. It is the group of automorphisms of Z2n preserving a non-degenerate skew symmetric form. The name "paramodular group" is often used to mean one of several standard matrix representations of this group. The corresponding group over the reals is called the parasymplectic group and is conjugate to a (real) symplectic group.  A paramodular form is a Siegel modular form for a paramodular group.

Explicit matrices for the paramodular group
There are two conventions for writing the paramodular group as matrices. In the first (older) convention the matrix entries are integers but the group is not a subgroup of the symplectic group, while in the second convention the paramodular group is a subgroup of the usual symplectic group (over the rationals) but its coordinates are not always integers. These two forms of the symplectic group are conjugate in the general linear group.

Any nonsingular skew symmetric form on Z2n is equivalent to one given by a matrix

where F is an n by n diagonal matrix whose diagonal elements Fii are positive integers with each dividing the next.
So any paramodular group is conjugate to one preserving the form above, in other words it consists of the matrices

of GL2n(Z) such that

The conjugate of the paramodular group by the matrix

(where I is the identity matrix) lies in the symplectic group Sp2n(Q),
since

though its entries are not in general integers. This conjugate is also often called the paramodular group.

The paramodular group of degree 2

Paramodular group of degree n=2 are subgroups of GL4(Q) so can be represented as 4 by 4 matrices. There are at least 3 ways of doing this used in the literature.
This section describes how to represent it as a subgroup of Sp4(Q) with entries that are not necessarily integers.

Any non-degenerate skew symmetric form on Z4 is up to isomorphism and scalar multiples equivalent to one given as above by the matrix
.
In this case one form of the paramodular group consists of the symplectic matrices of the form

where each * stands for an integer.
The fact that this matrix is symplectic forces some further congruence conditions, so in fact the paramodular group consists of the symplectic matrices of the form

The paramodular group in this case is generated by matrices of the forms
 and 
for integers x, y, and z.

References

External links

Discrete groups
Modular forms